Eudonia alopecias is a moth in the family Crambidae. It was described by Edward Meyrick in 1901. It is endemic to New Zealand and has been found at Aoraki / Mount Cook in February.

Taxonomy
This species was first described by Edward Meyrick in 1901 using specimens collected at Aoraki / Mount Cook in February by R. W. Fereday and named Scoparia alopecias. Hudson discussed this species in his book The butterflies and moths of New Zealand. In 1988 John S. Dugdale placed this species in the genus Eudonia. The male lectotype is held at the Natural History Museum, London.

Description
Meyrick described the species as follows:

Distribution

This species is endemic to New Zealand and is found at Mount Cook.

Behaviour
Adults have been recorded on wing in February.

References

Moths described in 1901
Eudonia
Moths of New Zealand
Endemic fauna of New Zealand
Taxa named by Edward Meyrick
Endemic moths of New Zealand